Phytanoyl-CoA 2-hydroxylase interacting protein is a protein that in humans is encoded by the PHYHIP gene.

References

Further reading